The Panasonic Lumix DC-GH5M2, known as Lumix GH5II, is a mirrorless interchangeable-lens camera with a Micro Four Thirds mount, released by Panasonic on 25 June 2021. DC-GH5M2 evolved the video recording function that was very popular with the DC-GH5 and resolved issues such as autofocus and live streaming. The company has also announced that it will be enhancing its wired networking capabilities with a firmware update that is planned for sometime in 2021. It will also support USB tethering for direct connection to smartphones and IP streaming via LAN. Dual SD card slots and a full magnesium alloy body with dustproof, splashproof, and low temperature resistance specifications are also inherited from the DC-GH5, and USB charging is newly supported. There is no difference in appearance from the DC-GH5, and the weight difference is only 2 grams.

References

External links 

 

GH5M2
Cameras introduced in 2021